WLOY Loyola Radio is a non-commercial college radio station owned and operated by Loyola University Maryland, broadcasting on 1620 kHz AM, campus cable channels 3 and 35, and streaming on wloy.org , and iTunes, based in Baltimore and Timonium, Maryland.  WLOY operates multiple synchronized transmission locations under Part 15 of the FCC regulations, as well as on the Internet via multiple radio formats.

Founding
A campus carrier current radio station, known as "WVLC" and "WLCR", operated from March 19, 1975, until 1996, when it was closed to make way for renovations in the student center.

A group of students and Fr. Michael Braden (founder of the campus TV operations) persuaded Fr. Harold Ridley, then President of the college, to start a new, state-of-the-art facility for students that would also embrace the Communications Department coursework as a laboratory.  A new facility was designed and installed by LPB Communications, Inc., Ziger Snead, James Posey Associates and Acoustic Dimensions.  Construction was completed in autumn of 2002.  John Devecka was hired as the Operations Manager, and the initial student staff was trained to begin broadcasting.  William Coveney '03 was the first student General Manager, Kathryn Lowry '05 the first Music Director.  WLOY went live March 19, 2003 and has broadcast continuously since.

Programming
WLOY follows a general rock music radio format, playing contemporary, alternative, and classic rock.  Music selection trends from lighter in the morning towards heavier in the evening and overnight.  On-air staff, comprised almost exclusively of students, are given latitude to select songs within this radio format.

Specialty shows include world music, community voices, old time radio shows, a financial information show hosted by Dena Frenkel, CPRC, featuring discussions with guests on matters of financial planning and others.  Additional community-focused shows such as "What Happens Next?" and "Both Feet In:A Conversations with People Experiencing Homelessness" have garnered national awards and recognition for their innovation.  A former specialty show, Shut Up, I'm on the Radio, was awarded "Best Local Music Radio Show" in 2006 by the Baltimore City Paper.  The station also frequently broadcasts live coverage of Loyola Greyhounds NCAA Division I sporting events.  The station was a finalist for Best Radio Promotion at the National Student Production Awards in 2009.  The station won the Fr. Timothy Brown, S.J. Club of the Year award for 2009-2010 as a result of campus and community efforts including raising over $22,000 for earthquake relief in Haiti.  The station was selected to the Top 25 College Radio Stations in the 2011 mtvU Woodie Awards, one of only 3 stations selected without a broadcast license.  WLOY was selected in 2012 to the Top 10 College Radio Stations at the mtvU Woodie Awards.

WLOY incorporates local artists throughout the program format, including weekly free performances on campus and regular in studio interviews.  In 2014 WLOY programmed a music stage for both days of HonFest with 14 local artists.

Awards
2006: Best of Baltimore Baltimore City Paper - Best Local Music Radio Show - Shut Up I'm on the Radio

2009: National Finalist - National Student Production Awards - Best Station Promotion

2011: Top 25 College Radio Station, at the 2011 mtvU Woodie Awards

2011: Winner - National Student Production Awards - Best Community Involvement: What Happens Next? program

2011: Winner - National Student Production Awards - Best Podcast: Both Feet In program

2011: Winner - Associated Collegiate Press Best of Show - Best Podcast: What Happens Next?

2012: Top 10 College Radio Station, at the 2012 mtvU Woodie Awards

2013: Finalists - National Student Production Awards - Best Podcast, Best Regularly Scheduled Program (2 Finalist awards)

2013: Winner - National Student Production Awards - Best Feature – What Happens Next? program

2013: Winner - National Student Production Awards - Best Community Involvement – Word on the Street newspaper

Associations
WLOY is a founding member of the Baltimore Community Radio Coalition, and carries programming produced by underrepresented communities within Baltimore City.  As a member WLOY has contributed equipment, installation and training to the program in Dallas F. Nicholas Sr. Elementary School, among others.  Material produced by Learning, Inc. and students at Dallas Nicholas airs Saturdays at noon and Sundays at 2pm as part of the community radio hour.  In the summer of 2009 the station began a children's literacy program What Happens Next? which also airs as part of the community radio hour.  In 2010 the station began airing Both Feet In: Conversations with people experiencing homelessness.

WLOY is a member of the College Broadcasters, Inc. and the Broadcast Education Association.  Its Operations Manager is a full member of the Audio Engineering Society and the Society of Broadcast Engineers.

WLOY is an iTunes iTunes affiliated station and is listed in iTunes Radio under the College heading.

WLOY is a co-founder and financial supporter of Word On The Street (newspaper) a newspaper focused on the issues of homelessness and poverty in Baltimore

WLOY is a participant in College Radio Day and has served as the Maryland State HQ since the event's inception.

External links
Official Website
Station feature in ProAudio Review Magazine 
BEA organization newsletter mention 
mtvU Woodie Awards 
2011 National Student Production Awards 
2011 Associated Collegiate Press Awards 
2012 mtvU Woodie Awards Top 10 College Radio Stations 
2013 National Student Production Awards

References

Loyola University Maryland
LOY
LOY
Radio stations established in 2002
2002 establishments in Maryland